Point system: 32, 28, 24, 22, 20, 18, 16, 14, 12, 10, 8, 6, 4, 2, 1 for 15th. In each race 2 points for Fastest lap and 2 for Pole position in race 1.
 Races: 2 race by rounds length of 30 minutes each.

References

Formula Renault 2.0 series